Sacred Songs of Mary 2, the second volume of the series, is a 2014 compilation album from Valley Entertainment featuring music devoted to Mary (mother of Jesus).

Track listing

References

2014 compilation albums
New-age compilation albums
Valley Entertainment compilation albums